Amyia is a genus of beetles in the family Buprestidae, containing the following species:

 Amyia punctipennis Waterhouse, 1887
 Amyia violacea (Gory & Laporte, 1839)

References

Buprestidae genera